Harry Parsons Cross (September 29, 1873 – March 12, 1955) was an American college football player and coach.

Athletic and coaching career
Cross played center for Yale University's football team from 1893 to 1895. He was also an accomplished track and field athlete, competing in the hammer throw. In 1896, he was ranked as the second-best hammer thrower behind James Mitchell.

In 1896, Cross became the head football coach at Stanford, guiding the team to a 2–1–1 record and a Big Game victory over Cal. He coached the team again in 1898, earning a 5–3–1 record.

After football
Cross graduated from Harvard Law School in 1900 and settled in Providence, Rhode Island, where he established a law firm and worked as an assistant attorney general for the state of Rhode Island. He died in 1955.

Head coaching record

See also
 List of college football head coaches with non-consecutive tenure

References

External links

1873 births
1955 deaths
19th-century players of American football
American male hammer throwers
American football centers
Stanford Cardinal football coaches
Yale Bulldogs football players
Harvard Law School alumni
Sportspeople from Providence, Rhode Island
People from South Kingstown, Rhode Island
Coaches of American football from Rhode Island
Players of American football from Providence, Rhode Island